Live at the Bluebird or Split Lip Rayfield / Live at the Bluebird Theatre / Denver, CO is the second live album from the bluegrass/punk band Split Lip Rayfield.  It was recorded live on January 28 of 2006 at The Bluebird Theatre in Denver, Colorado.  It contains music from their first three albums and the music is significantly faster than the studio-recorded versions.  It is significant that this is the only work by Split Lip Rayfield that does not contain the contributions of Wayne Gottsine, the band's mandolin player, who was on hiatus from the band at the time.

Track listing

Devil 3:09
Redneck Tailgate Dream 3:14
SOB 2:04
In The Ground 2:37
Pinball Machine 3:00
Record Shop 4:06
Lonesome Heart 2:20
Grip 2:16
PB24SS 2:51
Love Please Come Home 1:25
Honestly 1:54
Used To Be 3:22
Long Haul Weekend 1:13
Trouble 3:26
Hounds 3:08
C'mon Get Your Gun 1:50
Kiss Of Death 4:12
Outlaw 3:07
Flat Black Rag 1:51
Drink Lotsa Whiskey 5:21
San Antone 5:16

Personnel
Jeff Eaton -  Gas Tank Bass, Vocals
Kirk Rundstrom    -  Guitar, Vocals
Eric Mardis   -  Banjo, Vocals

Split Lip Rayfield albums
2006 live albums